A Modern Affair is a 1996 independent feature film directed by Vern Oakley and produced by Tribe Pictures.

Starring Stanley Tucci and Lisa Eichhorn, the film's plot reverses the conventions of romantic comedies: instead of man meet woman - fall in love, marry and have baby, in this film the woman gets pregnant, then meets the father, then falls in love. Grace Rhodes (Lisa Eichhorn) is a lonely, successful executive whose biological clock is loudly ticking. Giving up on finding the right man, she resorts to using a sperm bank on the advice of her best friend Elaine (Caroline Aaron). Soon she is pregnant, but she becomes so curious as to the identity of the father that she goes on a quest to find him with the help of Elaine. Peter Kessler (Stanley Tucci) is a nature photographer living in Upstate New York. While his life style differs from her, he is also reluctant to commit to a relationship, indulging in a casual affair with a married woman (Mary Jo Salerno). His photographs only feature landscapes, because, as far as he is concerned, "people mess up composition".

His world is rocked when Grace comes into the picture. And announces she's pregnant. "You got yourself into this situation," he tells her. "You're going to have to get yourself out. I'm not going to take responsibility for your baby." While at first he runs away from any intimacy, he renews contact with Grace later. From then on begins their discovery of mutual commitment and their journey to parenthood.

A Modern Affair purports to investigate the meaning of bringing a child to the world, rather than tackling the artificial insemination and sperm bank which serve as a ploy to explore intimacy and commitment. Coincidentally, since the film was made, the identity of sperm donors has been offered more readily to the children conceived by anonymous donors.

Winner of the Long Island Festival Audience Award, A Modern Affair played theatrically, was broadcast by HBO and distributed by Columbia TriStar Home Video.

References

 L.A. Times review
 Rotten Tomatoes entry
 Fancast movie of the week
 NYU Medical School review

External links
 Official Website
 

1996 romantic comedy films
1996 films
American romantic comedy films
Films set in New York City
TriStar Pictures films
1990s American films